Pat 'Red' Collier played Gaelic football at senior level for the Meath county team in the 1960s. He won 1 All-Ireland title with Meath in 1967. He played club football for Stamullen. He first played for Meath in the Right Full Back position but he is best remembered as an attacking and determined Right Half Back.

External links
 Official Meath Website

Year of birth missing (living people)
Living people
Gaelic football backs
Meath inter-county Gaelic footballers
Stamullen Gaelic footballers